Claude Bodin (born 15 May 1952 in Versailles) is a member of the National Assembly of France and represents the Val-d'Oise department. He is a member of the Union for a Popular Movement.

References

1952 births
Living people
People from Versailles
Republican Party (France) politicians
Liberal Democracy (France) politicians
Union for a Popular Movement politicians
The Popular Right
Deputies of the 13th National Assembly of the French Fifth Republic